Galiteuthis phyllura, also known as the cockatoo squid, is a species of glass squid, possibly the largest in the genus.

In 1984, the Russian stern-trawler Novoulianovsk brought up the remains of a gigantic specimen of G. phyllura from a depth of 1000–1300 m in the Sea of Okhotsk. Based on this material, which consisted of a 40 cm long arm and 115 cm tentacle, Kir Nesis estimated the mantle length at 265–275 cm, and the total length at over 4 m. This would make it the second largest squid species in terms of mantle length, after only the colossal squid, and even surpassing the mantle length of the giant squid. However, Nesis added that "because of its narrow body, we conclude that its mass is consistently lower than that of the other large squids".

The type specimen of G. phyllura was collected in Monterey Bay, California and is deposited in the National Museum of Natural History.

See also
Cephalopod size

References

External links

Tree of Life web project: Galiteuthis phyllura
Galiteuthis phyllura: Description continued

Squid
Molluscs described in 1911
Taxa named by Samuel Stillman Berry